Achille Roncoroni (21 April 1923 – 23 April 2005) was an Italian industrial and sailor. He competed in the Swallow event at the 1948 Summer Olympics.

References

External links
 
 

1923 births
2005 deaths
Italian male sailors (sport)
Olympic sailors of Italy
Sailors at the 1948 Summer Olympics – Swallow
Sportspeople from Milan